Richard John Gregson (5 May 1930 – 21 August 2019) was a British talent agent, film producer and screenwriter.

Career
Gregson spent his early career working in America, alongside stars such as Robert Redford, Julie Christie, Alan Bates and Gene Hackman and director John Schlesinger. He married the American actress Natalie Wood on 30 May 1969. The couple filed for divorce on 4 August 1971, and the divorce was finalised in April of the following year. Together they had one child, the actress Natasha Gregson Wagner, born 1970.

Gregson was nominated for the Academy Award for Best Original Screenplay at the 33rd Academy Awards for his work on The Angry Silence with his elder brother Michael Craig and Bryan Forbes.

Among his clients were Joe Janni, John Schlesinger and Alan Bates.

Personal life 
He was born in India to Violet Hanson, a granddaughter of Reginald Hanson, who was Lord Mayor of London from 1886 to 1887, and her second husband, Captain Donald Gregson, formerly of the 3rd Indian Cavalry. In 1933, his uncle, Charlie Hanson, drowned, somewhat questionably, in the River Thames. Gregson's parents divorced in 1944 and his mother remarried; she lived until the age of 100.

In 2012, he published a memoir titled Behind the Screen Door: Tales from the Hollywood Hills.

Gregson had three children – Sarah, Charlotte and Hugo – by his first wife Sally, whom he divorced in 1967. He had a daughter Natasha by his second wife Natalie Wood. He was married to the British author Julia Gregson from 1984 until his death in 2019. The couple had one daughter, Poppy.

On 21 August 2019, his daughter, Natasha Gregson Wagner, announced his death from Parkinson's disease in Wales, on her mother's tribute Instagram account, also sharing a photo of him and her together taken earlier in the year. He was 89 years old.

Select credits
 The Angry Silence (1960) – co-writer
 Downhill Racer (1969) – producer

References

External links
 

1930 births
2019 deaths
British film producers
British screenwriters
British talent agents
Male actors from Pune